The 16th Dallas–Fort Worth Film Critics Association Awards honoring the best in film for 2010 were announced on December 17, 2010. These awards "recognizing extraordinary accomplishment in film" are presented annually by the Dallas–Fort Worth Film Critics Association (DFWFCA), based in the Dallas–Fort Worth metroplex region of Texas. The organization, founded in 1990, includes 28 film critics for print, radio, television, and internet publications based in north Texas. The Dallas–Fort Worth Film Critics Association began presenting its annual awards list in 1991.

The Social Network was the DFWFCA's most awarded film of 2010 taking top honors in the Best Picture, Best Director (David Fincher), and Best Screenplay (Aaron Sorkin) categories. This continued a trend of critics groups across the United States giving their top prizes to the film about the founding of Facebook.

Two films each took two top prizes: 127 Hours garnered a Best Actor nod for James Franco as real-life mountain climber Aron Ralston plus Anthony Dod Mantle and Enrique Chediak for Best Cinematography. The Fighter earned Christian Bale the Best Supporting Actor honor for his performance as real-life boxer Dicky Eklund and Melissa Leo the Best Supporting Actress award for her portrayal of Dicky's mother, Alice Eklund.

The other acting award went to Natalie Portman as Best Actress for her leading role in Black Swan. The remaining film honors went to Toy Story 3 as Best Animated Film, Waiting for "Superman" as Best Documentary, and Mexico's Biutiful as Best Foreign Language Film.

Along with the 11 "best of" category awards, the group also presented the Russell Smith Award to Winter's Bone as the "best low-budget or cutting-edge independent film" of the year. The award is named in honor of late Dallas Morning News film critic Russell Smith.

Winners
Winners are listed first and highlighted with boldface. Other films ranked by the annual poll are listed in order. While most categories saw 5 honorees named, some categories ranged from as many as 10 (Best Film) to as few as 2 (Best Cinematography, Best Animated Film, Best Screenplay).

Category awards

Individual awards

Russell Smith Award
 Winter's Bone, for "best low-budget or cutting-edge independent film"

References

External links
 Dallas–Fort Worth Film Critics Association official website

2010
2010 film awards